Marguerite Françoise Bouvier de la Mothe de Cepoy (1767–1808), known as Countess de Buffon, was a French noble, known as the royal mistress of  Louis Philippe II, Duke of Orléans from 1784 until 1793.

She was the daughter of marquis Guillaume François de Cepoy and Élisabeth Amaranthe Jogues de Martinville and married count Georges Louis Marie Leclerc de Buffon (1764-1794) in 1784; the same year, she became the lover of Orléans, with whom she had a son, count Victor du Buffon (1792-1812). During the Terror, she helped the legitimate sons of Orléans escape prison. In 1794, she divorced and emigrated to England, where she became a supporter of Louis Philippe.

References 

Mistresses of Louis Philippe II, Duke of Orléans
French countesses
1767 births
1808 deaths
18th-century French women
19th-century French women